Bojan Radulović may refer to:
 Bojan Radulović (basketball)
 Bojan Radulović (footballer)